Ernst-Happel-Stadion, known as Praterstadion until 1992, sometimes also called Wiener-Stadion, is a football stadium in Leopoldstadt, the 2nd district of Austria's capital Vienna. With 50,865 seats, it is the largest stadium in Austria. It was built between 1929 and 1931 for the second Workers' Olympiad to the design of German architect Otto Ernst Schweizer. The stadium was renamed in honour of Austrian footballer Ernst Happel following his death in 1992.  The stadium hosted seven games in UEFA Euro 2008, including the final which saw Spain triumph over Germany.

The stadium is owned by the City of Vienna (Municipal Department 51 – Sports of the City of Vienna). It is managed by the Wiener Stadthalle Betriebs und Veranstaltungsgesellschaft m.b.H., a subsidiary of Wien Holding. It is a UEFA Category 4 stadium, and as such, it is the home of the Austria national football team. It also hosts the Viennese clubs' matches in UEFA competitions.

The stadium is served by Stadion station on the U2 metro line and 11A bus line.

History

1928–1945 
The foundation stone was laid in November 1928 in honor of the 10-year celebration of the Republic of Austria. The stadium was constructed in 23 months, from 1929 to 1931. It was built according to a design by the Tübingen architect Otto Ernst Schweizer and the second Workers' Olympiad. Schweizer also designed the adjacent Stadionbad (with 400,000 sq m, Europe's largest swimming pool). According to its location in Vienna's Prater, it was initially named Prater Stadium. It was a modern stadium at the time, particularly in Europe, because of its short discharge time of only 7 to 8 minutes. Initially the stadium had a capacity of approximately 60,000 people.

During the National Socialist Era following Anschluss (1938–1945), the stadium was used as a military barracks and staging area and as a temporary prison for the deportation of Jewish citizens. Between 11 and 13 September 1939, after the attack on Poland, over a thousand Polish-born Viennese Jews were detained on the orders of Reinhard Heydrich. They were imprisoned beneath the grandstands in the corridors of Section B. On 30 September, 1,038 prisoners were deported to the Buchenwald concentration camp. The next day, the stadium was back to being used as a football pitch. 44 men were released in early 1940, 26 were freed in 1945, the rest were murdered in the camps. In 1988, one of the surviving victims, Fritz Klein, was awarded compensation by the Austrian government equivalent to 62,50 euros for being detained in the stadium. In 2003 a memorial plaque, commemorating these events, was unveiled in the VIP area by a private initiative. In 1944, the stadium was severely damaged during a bomb attack on the Wehrmarcht Staff offices.

1945–2000 
After the war and the reconstruction of the stadium, it was again sporting its original use. In 1956, the stadium's capacity was expanded to 92,708 people by Theodor Schull, but in 1965 the capacity was reduced. The attendance record was 90,726 spectators set on 30 October 1960 at the football match between Spain and Austria (0–3).

In the mid-1980s, the stands were covered and fully equipped with seats. At its reopening a friendly match against archrival Germany was organised. Austria won the match 4–1. After the death of former Austrian top player and coach Ernst Happel (1925–1992), the Prater Stadium was renamed after him in 1992.
In 1964, 1987, 1990, and 1995, the Ernst Happel Stadium was the venue of the European Cup/UEFA Champions League final.

In 1970, the stadium was the venue of the 1970 European Cup Winners' Cup Final which saw Manchester City F.C. beat Górnik Zabrze 2–1. Neil Young and a Francis Lee penalty sealed the win for City. This final was played under torrential rain in what was then an uncovered stadium. This along with the fact no Polish supporters were allowed to travel to the match restricted the attendance, which is variously reported at between 7,900 and 15,000 spectators. Even so, City's travelling support numbered over 4,000 which was a then record for an English club playing on the continent.

UEFA Euro 2008
During the UEFA Euro 2008 tournament, the Ernst Happel-Stadion hosted seven games (three group matches of the Austria, two quarter finals, a semifinal match, and the Final match). In preparation for the tournament, the first and second place additional rows of seats increased the stadium's capacity to 53,000 seats.

Leading up to the tournament, it was fitted with a heated pitch in the summer of 2005. In May 2008, a connection to the Vienna U-Bahn was established, easing access from all over the city. The cost of the rebuilding was €39,600,000.

The following games were played at the stadium during the UEFA Euro 2008:

Football
The Ernst Happel Stadium is the largest football stadium in Austria. It is the home of the Austria national football team. Club football matches are generally limited to the domestic cup final and international competitions featuring one of Vienna's top clubs, FK Austria Wien and SK Rapid Wien, as their regular stadiums are too small to host UEFA Champions League and UEFA Cup matches. Vienna derby matches between FK Austria and SK Rapid have also been played in the stadium.

The stadium is rated one of UEFA's Five Star Stadiums permitting it to host the UEFA Champions League final. The seating capacity was temporarily expanded to 53,008 for the UEFA Euro 2008 championship, with the final played in the stadium. The stadium also hosted 3 group games, 2 quarter-final matches, a semi-final and final. The attendance record of 92,706 for the match against the Soviet Union was in 1960. The capacity has since been reduced.

Notable matches held in the stadium
1964 European Cup Final: Internazionale 3–1 Real Madrid
1970 European Cup Winners' Cup Final: Manchester City 2–1 Górnik Zabrze
1987 European Cup Final: Porto 2–1 Bayern Munich
1990 European Cup Final: Milan 1–0 Benfica
1994 UEFA Cup Final: Internazionale 1–0 Austria Salzburg
1995 UEFA Champions League Final: Ajax Amsterdam 1–0 Milan
UEFA Euro 2008 Final: Spain 1–0 Germany

Other sports
Other sporting events are held in the stadium, including athletics, cycling and tennis. In 1950, 35,000 watched Austrian Josef Weidinger win the European Heavyweight crown against Stefan Olek (of France), and a temporary pool in the stadium was the venue for the 1995 European LC Championships.

On 16 July 2011, the American Football World Championship final took place where USA defeated rivals Canada with a score of 50–7 in front of 20,000 spectators.

On 6 and 7 June 2014, the three games of the final stage of the 13th European Championship of American Football took place in this stadium. In the final 27,000 spectators saw Austria lose to Germany 30–27 in double overtime.

Concerts

References 

Sports venues completed in 1931
Sports venues in Vienna
Football venues in Austria
Athletics (track and field) venues in Austria
Buildings and structures in Leopoldstadt
UEFA Euro 2008 stadiums in Austria
Austria
UEFA European Championship final stadiums
American football venues in Austria
1931 establishments in Austria
20th-century architecture in Austria